Athamanta montana, synonym Tinguarra montana, is a species of  plants in the family Apiaceae, endemic to the Canary Islands.

References 

 GBIF entry

Apioideae
Endemic flora of the Canary Islands
Plants described in 1887